Joseph-Theodor Blank is a German politician of the Christian Democratic Union (CDU) and former member of the German Bundestag.

Life 
Blank was a member of the German Bundestag from 1983 to 2002. He is the nephew of Germany's first Minister of Defence, Theodor Blank, and the son of the German politician Joseph Blank.

References 

1947 births
Living people
Members of the Bundestag for North Rhine-Westphalia
Members of the Bundestag 1998–2002
Members of the Bundestag 1994–1998
Members of the Bundestag 1990–1994
Members of the Bundestag 1987–1990
Members of the Bundestag 1983–1987
Members of the Bundestag for the Christian Democratic Union of Germany